The Victory Cup was a one-off Scottish football competition held in 1946 to celebrate the end of World War II. It is an unofficial competition in statistical terms, taking place at the end of the 1945–46 season just before official competitions such as the Scottish Football League and the Scottish Cup resumed.

The winners of the Victory Cup were Rangers who defeated Hibernian 3–1 in the final at Hampden Park in Glasgow.

Summary
The format was a straight knockout tournament open to clubs from across Scotland, with the first round being played over two legs, subsequent rounds in a single match with replays as necessary and the semi-finals and final at neutral venues. A preliminary tournament took place between September 1945 and January 1946, with Clachnacuddin and East Stirlingshire (who won the final held between them in a second replay) qualifying to make up 32 participants for the final tournament which was held between April and June 1946.

The trophy itself had been used throughout the war for the Southern League Cup which was contested five times on a regional basis, four of these being won by Rangers. Its last edition was played on a nationwide basis (acting as a forerunner to the Scottish League Cup) and was won by Aberdeen. However, the Scottish Football Association asked for the trophy to be returned for use in the Victory Cup, and Rangers' win meant it stayed in their possession permanently.

A similar wartime competition was held at the end of World War I, won by St Mirren.

A separate Victory In Europe Cup had been held in May 1945, in the form of a single match at Hampden between Celtic and Queen's Park arranged by the organisers of the Glasgow Merchants Charity Cup; Celtic won that trophy by having won one more corner kick, following a 1–1 result.

Results

First round

Second round

Replays

Quarter-finals

Replays

Semi-finals

Replay

Final

References

1945–46 in Scottish football
Defunct football cup competitions in Scotland
Wartime football in Scotland